Charles Xavier Joseph de Franque Ville d'Abancourt (4 July 17589 September 1792) was a French statesman, minister to Louis XVI.

Biography
D'Abancourt was born in Douai, and was the nephew of Charles Alexandre de Calonne.  He was Louis XVI's last minister of war (July 1792), and organised the defence of the Tuileries Palace during the 10 August attack. Commanded by the Legislative Assembly to send away the Swiss Guards, he refused, and was arrested for treason to the nation and sent to Orléans to be tried.

At the end of August the Assembly ordered Abancourt and the other prisoners at Orléans to be transferred to Paris with an escort commanded by Claude Fournier, nicknamed l'Americain. At Versailles they learned of the massacres at Paris. Abancourt and his fellow-prisoners were murdered in cold blood during the 9 September massacres (9 September 1792) at Versailles. Fournier was unjustly charged with complicity in the crime.

Notes

References
 

1758 births
1792 deaths
People from Douai
French murder victims
18th-century French politicians
1792 crimes in Europe
People killed in the French Revolution
French Ministers of War
Burials at the Cemetery of Saint-Louis, Versailles